Anoeta Sports Complex is a sports area located at the south of the city of Donostia (San Sebastián), Basque Country of Spain. It includes a number of facilities, with the Anoeta Stadium standing out as its main sports ground, home to the Spanish football premier league's team Real Sociedad.

Sports facilities

 Anoeta Stadium
 Txuri Urdin Ice Rink Palace
 Antonio Elorza Velodrome, a.k.a. Anoeta Velodrome
 Miniestadio de Anoeta
 Jose Antonio Gasca City Sports Centre 
 Paco Yoldi City Sports Centre and Swimming Pools 
 Anoeta City Fronton
 Atano III Fronton
 City Archery Hall
 City Court of Air Rifle Practice
 City Court of Martial Arts 
 Chess Centre

Sporting clubs
CHH Txuri Urdin Ice Hockey Team
Real Sociedad Football Team

Cultural venues
 Ernest LLuch Cultural Centre 
 Real Sociedad Museum

Public management
 Youth Information Centre
 Kirol-Etxea
 Donostia Kirola

See also
 Amarapedia

External links
 Sitio web oficial de Anoeta
 Sitio web oficial de Donostia Kirola
 Sitio web oficial del Centro Cultural Ernest LLuch

Real Sociedad
Sports venues in the Basque Country (autonomous community)
Velodromes in Spain
Sports complexes